Niria Yvonne Rust  (19 November 1922 – 26 June 2002) was a New Zealand potter and artist.

Biography 

Rust completed a diploma in fine arts in 1946 and became a high school art teacher, mostly in Canterbury, in New Zealand's South Island. She developed pottery skills in the communities in which she lived, starting eight studios. She also organised and directed the first national pottery workshop and school and started her own art school in 1959. In 1967 she moved to the West Coast and started teaching at Greymouth High School. She established a pottery workshop in an old brewery near Greymouth, and with assistance from Barry Brickell and others, built a coal-fired salt kiln.

In 1972, she retired from teaching, returned to her home region of Northland and became a fulltime potter at Parua Bay. In 1976 she established the Northland Craft Trust and worked to secure a site in a disused quarry near Whangārei for a regional art and craft centre. The centre, Quarry Arts Centre, opened in 1980.

In the 1983 New Year Honours, Rust was awarded the Queen's Service Medal for community service. A few years later, she began painting and later received an award for her work from the New Zealand Academy of Fine Arts in Wellington.

In 1997, Rust returned to the West Coast to live in Runanga. She died in Greymouth in 2002, aged 79.

References

Further reading 
 
 

1922 births
2002 deaths
New Zealand potters
Recipients of the Queen's Service Medal